Richard Whithed (c. 1660 – 17 March 1693) was an English politician from Hampshire who sat in the House of Commons of England between 1689 and 1693.

Whithed was elected in 1690 as a Member of Parliament for the borough of Stockbridge. He was re-elected in 1690, and held the seat until his death from smallpox on 17 March 1693.

References 

1660s births
Year of birth unknown
1693 deaths
English MPs 1689–1690
English MPs 1690–1695
Deaths from smallpox
Infectious disease deaths in England
People from Test Valley